Tekin Airport is an airport in Tekin, Papua New Guinea.

References

External links
 

Airports in Papua New Guinea